Faraskur is a city in Damietta Governorate, Egypt. Before the 1952 revolution it was a part of Dakahlia Governorate.

Notable people
Riad Al Sunbati

See also
Battle of Fariskur (1219), during the Fifth Crusade
Battle of Fariskur (1250), during the Seventh Crusade

References

Populated places in Damietta Governorate